Tomorrow Corporation is an independent video game studio consisting of Kyle Gabler, Allan Blomquist, and Kyle Gray. It is a division of the Experimental Gameplay Group.

History
Gabler, Blomquist, and Gray met in graduate school and went on to join separate divisions of Electronic Arts. Gabler and Blomquist became restless at EA and opted to develop independently, with Gabler forming 2D Boy and helping to create World of Goo. Blomquist would go on to work on the Wii port of World of Goo, while Gray worked as the lead designer for Henry Hatsworth in the Puzzling Adventure.

In 2010, once those projects were completed, the trio met again and decided to form Tomorrow Corporation. They produced their first title, Little Inferno in 2012. Their next game, Human Resource Machine, was released in October 2015, and its sequel, 7 Billion Humans in August 2018. In March 2018, they announced their next game would be titled Welcome to the Information Superhighway.

The company supports the Experimental Gameplay Project, which encourages non-standard game development strategies. The Project, originally started by Gabler and Gray while at Carnegie Mellon University in 2005 aims less to be a competitor, and more a source of inspiration, for other game developers, recognizing that game conception is generally one of the more difficult aspects of development.

The goal of the project was to encourage individual developers to create a functional game prototype within seven days based on a given abstract theme, such as "gravity" or "flowers".  Developers are then free to continue to expand on the development if they choose; for example, World of Goo is based on Tower of Goo which was one of the original entries for the Project.

Games

References

External links 
 

Video game companies established in 2010
Video game development companies
Indie video game developers